Hansa (minor planet designation: 480 Hansa), provisional designation , is a stony asteroid and the namesake of the Hansa family located in the central region of the asteroid belt, approximately  in diameter. It was discovered on 21 May 1901, by astronomers Max Wolf and Luigi Carnera at the Heidelberg Observatory in southwest Germany. The S-type asteroid has a rotation period of 16.19 hours and possibly an elongated shape. It was named after the Hanseatic League, a medieval European trade association.

Orbit and classification 

Hansa is the namesake and parent body of the stony Hansa family, a high-inclination family with more than a thousand known members. Hansa and the asteroid 925 Alphonsina are the two largest member of this family.

It orbits the Sun in the central asteroid belt at a distance of 2.5–2.8 AU once every 4 years and 4 months (1,570 days; semi-major axis of 2.64 AU). Its orbit has an eccentricity of 0.05 and an inclination of 21° with respect to the ecliptic. The body's observation arc begins at Heidelberg, the night after its official discovery observation in May 1901.

Physical characteristics 

In the Tholen classification, Hansa is a common, stony S-type asteroid. The near infrared spectra suggests the surface has a primary component of low-Ca pyroxene with lower amounts of olivine.

Rotation period 

Several rotational lightcurves of Hansa were obtained from photometric observations since the 1990s. Analysis of the two best-rated lightcurves gave a rotation period of 16.19 hours with a brightness amplitude of 0.58 and 0.44 magnitude, respectively. A high brightness variation typically indicates an elongated shape.

A modeled lightcurve using photometric data from large collaboration network was published in 2016. It gave a concurring period of 16.1894 hours, as well as two spin axes at (352.0°, −18.0°) and (173.0°, −32.0°) in ecliptic coordinates (λ, β).

Diameter and albedo 

According to the surveys carried out by the Infrared Astronomical Satellite IRAS, the Japanese Akari satellite and the NEOWISE mission of NASA's Wide-field Infrared Survey Explorer, Hansa measures between 55.94 and 65.67 kilometers in diameter and its surface has an albedo between 0.162 and 0.254.

The Collaborative Asteroid Lightcurve Link adopts the results obtained by IRAS, that is an albedo of 0.2485 and a diameter of 56.22 kilometers based on an absolute magnitude of 8.38.

Naming 

This minor planet was named after the Hanseatic League, a medieval confederation of merchant guilds and market towns in Northern Europe and the Baltic region. On the height of its expansion during the 14th and 15th century, the league included cities that are now located in Germany, Poland, Sweden, Estonia, Latvia, the Netherlands and Russia. The official naming citation was mentioned in The Names of the Minor Planets by Paul Herget in 1955. The name was proposed by astronomer Heinrich Kreutz in 1906, who was an editor of the journal Astronomische Nachrichten based in the German city of Kiel, which was a member town of the Hanse League.

References

External links 
 Asteroid Lightcurve Database (LCDB), query form (info )
 Dictionary of Minor Planet Names, Google books
 Asteroids and comets rotation curves, CdR – Observatoire de Genève, Raoul Behrend
 Discovery Circumstances: Numbered Minor Planets (1)-(5000) – Minor Planet Center
 
 

000480
Discoveries by Max Wolf
Discoveries by Luigi Carnera
Named minor planets
000480
19010521